Palai Park (பாலை பூங்கா) is one among the two Genetic Heritage Gardens in Tamil Nadu (Palai Park at Achadiparambu, Ramanadhapuram and Kurinji Park at Yercaud, Salem). This park is maintained by the Department of Horticulture and Plantation Crops. It was named after the Palai landscape, one of the five landscapes mentioned in the ancient sangam literature representing dry ecological zone. This garden was developed by Tamil Nadu Horticulture Development Agency (TANHODA) and opened by then chief minister Selvi J. Jayalalithaa.

Interesting features 
Some of the interesting features in the Palai Genetic Heritage Garden include: lawns, sand dunes, a small pond, an Oasis, a nursery area, a park area for children, a podium area, gazebos and a food court.

Gallery

See also
List of botanical gardens in Tamil Nadu

References 

Gardens in India
Parks in India
Protected areas of Tamil Nadu
Ramanathapuram district
Botanical gardens in Tamil Nadu